Yellow River Marsh Preserve State Park is a Florida State Park located on Garcon Point, south of Milton, in northwestern Florida. A small parking area, gazebo, and public access point are located on Dickerson City Road.  Located on County Road 191, approximately one mile north of the intersection with County Road 281 and along both sides of the highway on Blackwater Bay.

Recreational Activities
The park has such amenities as birding, hiking, picnicking and wildlife viewing.

Park Fees
There are no entrance fees associated with this park.

External links
 Yellow River Marsh Preserve State Park at Florida State Parks
 Yellow River Marsh Aquatic Preserve at Florida's Department of Environmental Protection

Parks in Santa Rosa County, Florida
State parks of Florida